It's Great to Be Alive may refer to:
 It's Great to Be Alive (film), a 1933 sci-fi comedy film
 It's Great To Be Alive!, a 2015 live album by Drive-By Truckers
 It's Great to Be Alive (album), an album by Fake Problems
 "It's Great to Be Alive" (song), a song written by Johnny Mercer and recorded by Jo Stafford and then Johnny Mercer in My Huckleberry Friend
 It Is Great to Be Alive, a book by Harry Hooton

See also 
 "It's great to be alive in Colma", a humorous motto for Colma, California, now recorded in the city's website
 "It's Great to be Alive! It's great to be a Conk!", the motto for Kentwood High School (Washington)
 Yaşamak Güzel Şey be Kardeşim, or It's Great to Be Alive, Brother, a novel by Nâzım Hikmet
 "It's a Great Day to Be Alive", a song by Jon Randall, later recorded by Travis Tritt
 Great to Be Alive (disambiguation)
 It's Good to Be Alive (disambiguation)